Eumorphus is a genus of beetles belonging to the family Endomychidae.

Species
Eumorphus alboguttatus Gerstaecker, 1857 
Eumorphus assamensis Gerstaecker, 1857 
Eumorphus austerus Gerstaecker, 1857 
Eumorphus bicoloripedoides (Mader, 1955) 
Eumorphus bipunctatus Perty, 1831 
Eumorphus bulbosus Schaufuss, 1887 
Eumorphus carinatus Gerstaecker, 1857 
Eumorphus coloratus Gerstaecker, 1857 
Eumorphus columbinus Gerstaecker, 1857 
Eumorphus constrictus Arrow, 1926 
Eumorphus costatus Gorham, 1873 
Eumorphus cryptus Strohecker, 1968 
Eumorphus csikii Strohecker, 1957 
Eumorphus cyanescens Gerstaecker, 1857 
Eumorphus dehaani Guérin-Ménéville, 1858 
Eumorphus depressus Arrow, 1925 
Eumorphus dilatatus Perty, 1831 
Eumorphus drescheri Strohecker, 1957 
Eumorphus eburatus Gerstaecker, 1857 
Eumorphus elegans Strohecker, 1968 
Eumorphus eurynotus Strohecker, 1968 
Eumorphus felix Arrow, 1920 
Eumorphus festivus Arrow, 1920 
Eumorphus fraternus Arrow, 1920 
Eumorphus fryanus Gorham, 1875 
Eumorphus helaeus Arrow, 1920 
Eumorphus hilaris Arrow, 1928 
Eumorphus inflatus Arrow, 1920 
Eumorphus insignis Gorham, 1901 
Eumorphus leptocerus Strohecker, 1968 
Eumorphus longespinosus Pic, 1930 
Eumorphus lucidus Gorham, 1892 
Eumorphus macrospilotus Arrow, 1920 
Eumorphus marginatus Fabricius, 1801 
Eumorphus micans Strohecker, 1968 
Eumorphus minor Gerstaecker, 1858 
Eumorphus murrayi Gorham, 1874 
Eumorphus ocellatus Arrow, 1920 
Eumorphus oculatus Gerstaecker, 1857 
Eumorphus panfilovi Kryzhanovskij, 1960 
Eumorphus parvus Strohecker, 1968 
Eumorphus politus Gerstaecker, 1857 
Eumorphus productus Arrow, 1920 
Eumorphus purpureus Strohecker, 1968 
Eumorphus quadriguttatus (Illiger, 1800) 
Eumorphus quadrinotatus Gerstaecker, 1857 
Eumorphus sanguinipes (Guérin-Ménéville, 1858) 
Eumorphus simplex Arrow, 1920 
Eumorphus staudingeri Mader, 1936 
Eumorphus subsinuatus Pic, 1927 
Eumorphus sybarita Gerstaecker, 1857 
Eumorphus tetraspilotus Hope, 1832 
Eumorphus trabeatus Arrow, 1925 
Eumorphus tumescens Gorham, 1892 
Eumorphus wegneri Strohecker, 1956 
Eumorphus westwoodi  (Guérin-Ménéville, 1858)

References

External links
 Genus Eumorphus
 

Coccinelloidea genera
Endomychidae